The Nepal Police School (Nepali: नेपाल पुलिस विद्यालय) usually shortened as “NPS”, previously known as Dipendra Police School (Nepali: दिपेन्द्र पुलिस विद्यालय) (DPS) named after the late Crown Prince Dipendra Bir Bikram Shah of The Kingdom of Nepal is a regional system of police boarding schools in Nepal. The school motto is “Better Schooling for ideal Citizens”. The schools predominantly accept applications from children of Nepal police personnel but in some cases accept applications from non-police personnel children (up to 40% of the school population). The prospective students sit on competitive entrance exams as part of the admissions process for limited seats. These schools are funded by the welfare program of the Nepal Police Organisation. The school’s history, reputation for discipline, and holistic approach to education with a special focus on physical education and athletics have made Nepal Police School one of the highly reputable schools in Nepal.

The central school founded in 2040 B.S. (1983 CE) by former IGP (Inspector General Police) late DB Lama saheb is located at Banepa 13 Sanga, 15 miles east of Kathmandu covering over 200 acres on the growing forest and orchard of the southern sloped sunny hills of Sanga. The school admits pupils from class 4 to 12 and is follows SLC (School Leaving Certificate) board and HSEB (Higher Secondary Education Board)  curriculum. It offers boarding schools with strict policies and rigorous academic atmosphere. While there is a central governing body at Sanga, the regional schools generally entertain plenty of autonomy in running their respective schools.

Other branches

 Nepal Police Boarding High School, Dharan, Sunsari District (Eastern Regional School), officially and more popularly known as Purwa Chhetriya Police Boarding High School. Also called Eastern Regional Police Boarding High School.
 Nepal Police Boarding High School, Belchautara, Tanahu District (Western Regional School)
 Nepal Police Boarding High School, Gularia, Dang Deokhuri District (Mid-Western Regional School)
 Nepal Police Boarding High School, Dhangadi, Kailali District (Far Western Regional School)
 Nepal Police School (Secondary), Samakhusi, Kathmandu District
 Mid Regional Police Boarding High School, Jigadhiya, Rautahat District (Mid Regional School)
 Nepal Police School, Chitwan
 Nepal Police School, Surkhet

School administration
The school academic and administrative functions are headed by Principal and Camp Commandant (Nepal Police officer) respectively. The Camp Commandant of the Central School, Sanga is ranked Dy.SP (Deputy Superintendent of Police) and the commandant of branch schools is ranked Inspector.

Academics 
The school curriculum is presented primarily in English; however there is also an emphasis on developing skills with both written and oral Nepali. The school follows guidelines set by the Ministry of Education and the Higher Secondary Education Board of Nepal.

The central school have received Birendra Vidhya Rastriya Shield in the years 2051/52 B.S. and 2055/56 B.S.

Many alumni of the school have shown their phenomenal academic performance in various educational sectors. Pranesh Pyara Shrestha, who graduated from Nepal Police School, Dharan in 2074 B.S.(2018 CE) was declared "Sunsari Topper" in the final examination of Grade-11 and continued this feat by again maintaining his position as the District Topper in Grade-12 conducted by National Examination Board(N.E.B.), making him the "Back-to-back" Sunsari Topper. Similarly, Abhijaya Shrestha was declared Sunsari Topper in S.L.C. examination of 2068(B.S.). [Note: Topper is a term commonly used in Nepal to refer to someone ranked no. 1 in a certain field]

Sports 
The central school has also received Birendra Shield Regional Award in the year 2048 B.S and Regional Award in the year 2061 B.S.Police Schools are best known for their fierce sports teams, notably in football. The central school at Sanga have won numerous tournaments and yearly host the renowned IGP (Inspector General Police) Running trophy, an inter-school football tournament. The school football team have long-standing rivalries with Birendra Sainik School (military boarding school).The Eastern regional school at Dharan used to organise a similar DIG Cup football tournament for schools in the Eastern Development Region of Nepal, but discontinued after the 2006 season.

The schools have produced several football pros who went on to compete at the highest level for the club and the country:
 The decorated former goalkeeper Upendra Man Singh who also captained the national team for a decade attended the Dipendra Police School, Sanga (Central School).
 The current Nepal footballer Bimal Gharti Magar attended the Dipendra Police School, Belchautara, Tanahu District (Western Regional School).

Uniform 

The school dress for students at Police schools of Nepal is inspired by the country's police uniform. Students typically wear sky blue shirt, navy blue pants, school issued tie and belt, blue socks and black shoes. Girls may replace navy blue pants with navy blue skirts. Students may also add a navy blue sweater or blazer during winter months. Nails need to be trimmed, hair neatly combed and cut short for boys, and shirts should be tucked in.

References 

Schools in Nepal
Education in Nepal